Callimetopus capito is a species of beetle in the family Cerambycidae. It was described by Francis Polkinghorne Pascoe in 1865, originally under the genus Euclea. It is known from the Philippines. It feeds on Mangifera indica, Barringtonia asiatica, and Terminalia catappa. It contains the varietas Callimetopus capito var. mesoleucus.

References

Callimetopus
Beetles described in 1865